Souaid is a transliteration of various Arabic language surnames. It can refer to:

 Carolyn Marie Souaid (born 1959), Canadian writer
 Fares Souaid (born 1958), Lebanese politician
 Nadim Souaid (born 1986), Lebanese basketball player

See also
 Soueid

Arabic-language surnames